Kampong Tanjong Bunut is a village in Brunei-Muara District, Brunei, on the outskirts of the capital Bandar Seri Begawan. The population was 2,875 in 2016. It is one of the villages within Mukim Kilanas. The postcode is BF2920.

Facilities 
Ar-Rahman Mosque is the village mosque; it was inaugurated by Sultan Hassanal Bolkiah on 14 September 2018. The mosque can accommodate 1,260 worshippers.

References 

Tanjong Bunut